The 2004 AMJ Campbell Canadian Senior Curling Championships were held January 23 to February 1, 2004 at the Vernon Multiplex in Vernon, British Columbia. The winning teams represented Canada at the 2004 and 2005 World Senior Curling Championships.

Men's

Teams

Standings

Results

Draw 1

Draw 2

Draw 3

Draw 4

Draw 5

Draw 6

Draw 7

Draw 8

Draw 9

Draw 10

Draw 11

Draw 13

Draw 15

Draw 17

Draw 19

Draw 21

Playoffs

Tiebreaker

Semifinal

Final

Women's

Teams

Standings

Results

Draw 1

Draw 2

Draw 3

Draw 4

Draw 5

Draw 6

Draw 7

Draw 8

Draw 9

Draw 10

Draw 12

Draw 14

Draw 16

Draw 18

Draw 20

Draw 22

Playoffs

Semifinal

Final

External links
Men's statistics
Women's statistics

References

2004 in Canadian curling
Canadian Senior Curling Championships
Curling in British Columbia
2004 in British Columbia
Sport in Vernon, British Columbia
January 2004 sports events in Canada
February 2004 sports events in Canada